Serbs of Montenegro or Montenegrin Serbs, compose native and the second largest ethnic group in Montenegro (28.7% of country's population), after the ethnic Montenegrins. Additional 0.64% of the population is made up of Serbs-Montenegrins and Montenegrins-Serbs.

History

During the Slavic migrations of the 6th and 7th centuries, the territory of modern-day Montenegro was settled by Serbs, who created several principalities in the region. In southern parts of modern Montenegro, Principality of Duklja was formed, while western parts belonged to the Principality of Travunija. Northern parts of modern Montenegro belonged to the inner Principality of Serbia. All of those early polities were described in historiographical works of Byzantine Emperor Constantine VII Porphyrogenetos (944–959).

In 1018, all of Serbian principalities came under the supreme rule of the Byzantine Empire. Regions of Duklja and Travunija broke away from Byzantine rule c. 1034–1042, under prince Stefan Vojislav, founder of the Vojislavljević dynasty. His son Mihailo I Vojislavljević (d. 1081) liberated Zahumlje and inner Serbia, creating a united Serbian polity and taking the title of king (c. 1077). The reign of his son, King Constantine Bodin (d. 1100), was followed by a period of regional fragmentation, lasting throughout much of the 12th century.

After 1180, all of what is today Montenegro came under the rule of Grand Prince Stefan Nemanja, the founder of the Nemanjić dynasty. The region of Zeta, formerly known as Duklja, became a crown land of the united Serbian state. It was given to Vukan Nemanjić (d. 1208), the oldest son of Stefan Nemanja, and later to crown prince Stefan Radoslav, son of King Stefan Nemanjić, who succeeded his father as Serbian King in 1228. Thus it became a custom to grant the region to the heir of the throne or some other member of the royal family. In 1219, two dioceses of the Serbian Orthodox Church were created on the territory of modern-day Montenegro, Eparchy of Zeta centered in the Monastery of Holy Archangel Michael on Prevlaka, and Eparchy of Budimlja centered in the Monastery of Đurđevi Stupovi. Several other monasteries also date to this period, such as: Morača, Praskvica, Vranjina, and others. Serbian Despotate is the last independent medieval Serb state and it included most of modern-day Montenegro.

Montenegro saw independence under the Petrović-Njegoš dynasty, at first as a principality and then as a kingdom. Both the Kingdom of Serbia and the Kingdom of Montenegro fought together as independent states in the Balkan Wars and in the First World War. At the end of the war in 1918 tensions arose between the two states as the Montenegrin Whites with Serbian support deposed Nicholas I of Montenegro and proclaimed Montenegro's unification with Serbia as part of Kingdom of Serbs, Croats and Slovenes (renamed into Kingdom of Yugoslavia in 1929), while the Montenegrin Greens opposed it. The conflict led to the Christmas Uprising, in which the Whites with support from the Serbian army defeated the Greens. During the period of the monarchic Yugoslavia, ruled by the Serbian Karađorđević dynasty, the tensions between Serbs and Croats were increasing and most of the Montenegrin politicians supported the Serbian proposed centralised state.

During the Second World War both Serbs and Montenegrins were very active in both resistance movements, the Yugoslav Partisans and the Yugoslav Army in the Fatherland known as the Chetniks. At the end of the war the socialist Yugoslavia was created and the two became republics within the Yugoslav federation.

Yugoslav Partisan Milovan Đilas described himself as a Montenegrin Serb and described Montenegro as the spiritual homeland of Serbs, saying "I am not a Montenegrin because I am a Serb, but a Serb because I am a Montenegrin. We Montenegrins are the salt of the Serbs. All the strength of the Serbs is not here [in Montenegro] but their soul is." Đilas also has said "The Montenegrins are, despite provincial and historical differences, quintessentially Serbs, and Montenegro the cradle of Serbian myths and of aspirations for the unification of Serbs.".

After the secession of Slovenia, Croatia, Bosnia and Herzegovina and Macedonia in 1991 and 1992, SR Montenegro held the Montenegrin referendum in 1992 which ended with a 95.96% of votes in favour for a state union with Serbia and with the changing of the socialist political system towards a multi-party one. The country was renamed Federal Republic of Yugoslavia. In this period between 1990 and 1998 Montenegro was ruled by Momir Bulatović who had close relations with the Serbian president Slobodan Milošević and who was very supportive to keep close ties between the two republics within the state union. Montenegro was also included by the economic sanctions imposed on Serbia during the 1990s. During the 1999 NATO bombing of Yugoslavia both Serbia and Montenegro suffered the attacks of the NATO forces and several targets inside Montenegro were also bombarded. All this contributed to the rise in power in Montenegro of Milo Đukanović who was known to be much less sympathetic towards the Serbo-Montenegrin ties and would become an open supporter of the independence of Montenegro. In 2003, three years after the fall of Milošević in 2000, and after insisting on international diplomacy, the former Yugoslavia became known as the state union of Serbia and Montenegro. The process of becoming a single state union ironically lead to the separation of the two states - a change which was officiated by the referendum on Montenegrin independence on 21 May 2006. A total of 419,240 votes were cast, representing 86.5% of the total electorate. Of them, 230,661 votes or 55.5% were in favour of independence and 185,002 votes or 44.5% were against.

Since independence, the Montenegrin society has been divided among many issues. The independence supporters are advocating for the creation of a separate Montenegrin language, regarded before as a dialect of the Serbian language, including the creation of a new Montenegrin Cyrillic alphabet which shares the same letters with the Serbian Cyrillic alphabet except for the addition of two new letters. The Serb population of Montenegro is opposed to the idea of a linguistic separation, just as they are opposed to the separation of the Montenegrin Orthodox Church from the jurisdiction of the Serbian Orthodox Church. The Montenegrin language eventually gained international recognition and was assigned the ISO 639-2 and -3 code [cnr] in December 2017. However, the Montenegrin Orthodox Church is canonically unrecognized as of 2021.

In 2006, the NGO Serbian People's Council of Montenegro was created, headed by Momčilo Vuksanović, and in 2008 an official representative electoral body of Serbs in Montenegro was formed as the Serbian National Council of Montenegro, with Momčilo Vuksanović as president.

The links between the two nations remain strong, and the fact that for the last two centuries a great number of Montenegrins had emigrated to Serbia further strengthens the ties. The Montenegrin littoral is still the main tourist destination for citizens of Serbia, and a large population of Serbians own property in Montenegro. Many of these properties consist of summer homes, and contribute to a seasonal influx of Serbs in Montenegro, during the summers. Despite the geopolitical separation, the economic balance and relationship shared between the two countries continues to be strong.

Culture

Language

The national language of Montenegro has historically and traditionally been called Serbian. According to Pavle Ivić, two sub-dialects of the Shtokavian dialect (of the Serbian language) were spoken in Montenegro: the Eastern Herzegovinian dialect and Zeta-South Sanjak dialect. The Eastern Herzegovinian dialect is spoken in Montenegro, Serbia, Bosnia and Herzegovina and Croatia. Today, the national standard is based on the Zeta-South Sanjak dialect.

Some 42.9% of the population of the country speak Serbian as their mother tongue, including 37% of the declared Montenegrins. Serbian was the official language of Montenegro until 2007 when the new Constitution of Montenegro replaced the Constitution of 1992. Amid opposition from pro-Serbian parties, 

Montenegrin language was made the sole official language of the country and Serbian was given the status of a recognised minority language along with Bosnian, Albanian, and Croatian. Since 2006, both in linguistic and other aspects of cultural life, ethnic Serbs of Montenegro have been exposed to gradual "non-coercive" "Montenegrinisation".

Religion

The Serbs are adherents of the Serbian Orthodox Church, the strongest religious institution of Montenegro (with a total of 460,383 followers or 74%). One of the largest places of worship is the Cathedral of the Resurrection of Christ in Podgorica.

The future of the Serbian Orthodox Church in Montenegro has been threatened by the newly formed Montenegrin Orthodox Church which has claimed Serbian Orthodox churches in Montenegro, and is backed by a small percentage of the Orthodox Christians in Montenegro. The government has recognized the church, however none of the Eastern Orthodox churches have. The leader is the controversial Miraš Dedeić, a former Serbian Orthodox clergyman with Serbian nationalist views who, after being suspended from the Serbian Church, went to Rome and became a Greek Orthodox clergyman.

Folk attire

The Montenegrin cap is a traditional cap worn by Montenegrins and Montenegrin Serbs, originally in the shape of a flat cylinder, having a red upper surface (called tepeluk) not dissimilar to the Herzegovina and Lika caps. It was wholly red until Prince-Bishop Petar II Petrović Njegoš surrounded it with a black rim (called derevija), and the definition given was as a sign of grief of occupied Kosovo. The Kosovo Myth was very popular in the Prince-Bishopric of Montenegro. The enforcement of the cap upon the Montenegrin chieftains by Peter II was a mark of expression of then's dominating Serbian national identity. The national telling recorded the most often version of the cap as following: the black wrapper was sign of grief for the once big Empire, the red the bloody defeat at the Battle of Kosovo and the five small stripes on the top represent the remaining remains of the once greater Serbian realm, which became increasingly popular amongst the common folk during the reign of Prince Danilo I Petrović-Njegoš. Within the stripes is angled a six star, representing the last free part, Montenegro, shining upon the fallen and conquered. Worn by the rulers and chieftains, the version with the Four Ocil symbol in the star's place had become across the years with growth of nationalism excessively popular amongst the ordinary people, the symbol of the Serbian Orthodox Church, which effectively worked on maintaining and raising the national identity.

Demographics
 
 
 
According to the 2011 census, Serbs are the second largest ethnic group and constitute 28.7% of the population of Montenegro. They are absolute majority in three and relative majority in another three municipalities, and constitute less than 20% of population in only four out of total 21 municipalities in the country. The percentage of Serbs in municipalities of Montenegro is as follows:

Plužine (65.65%)
Andrijevica (61.86%)
Pljevlja (57.07%)
Herceg Novi (48.89%) (relative majority)
Berane (42.96%) (relative majority)
Šavnik (42.42%) 
Žabljak (41.30%)
Budva (37.71%)
Bijelo Polje (35.96%) (relative majority)
Kolašin (35.75%)
Mojkovac (35.47%)
Tivat (31.61%)
Kotor (30.57%)
Danilovgrad (27.07%)
Bar (25.34%)
Nikšić (25.31%)
Podgorica (23.26%)
Plav (16.01%)
Ulcinj (5.75%)
Cetinje (4.36%)
Rožaje (3.58%)

Notable people

See also

Serbia-Montenegro relations
Montenegrins of Serbia
Serbia and Montenegro
Serbian-Montenegrin unionism

Notes

References

Sources
Primary sources

 
 
 
 
 
 
 
 Anna Comnena, The Alexiad, translated by Elizabeth A. Dawes in 1928
 John Kinnamos, The Deeds of John and Manuel Comnenus, trans. C.M. Brand (New York, 1976). 

Secondary sources

 
 
  
 
 
 
 
 
 
 
 
 
 
 
 
 
 
  
 
 
 
 
 
 
 
 
 
 

 
Montenegrin people of Serbian descent
Serbian Orthodox Church in Montenegro